Giuseppe Vincenzo Gentile (born October 18, 1992) is an American professional soccer player who plays as a forward for Swiss club Chur 97.

He was born in Miami, Florida, but grew up in a small Swiss town called Cazis. He moved to Charlotte, North Carolina at age 15 to finish high school and go to college.

Career
After three seasons at UNC Charlotte, Gentile left college early and signed an MLS contract on January 22, 2014.  Two days later, he was acquired by Chicago Fire through the waiver draft.  On April 10, Gentile was loaned to USL Pro club Charlotte Eagles.  He made his professional debut two days later in a 2–1 victory over Richmond Kickers.

After his release from Chicago, Gentile signed with USL Pro club Orlando City on July 11, 2014. He was released upon the conclusion of the 2014 season, a casualty of the club's transition to Major League Soccer.

On January 21, 2015, Gentile signed with Swiss Challenge League club FC Chiasso.

During the NASL's midseason break on June 24, 2015, it was announced the Gentile would be returning to San Antonio on a loan deal.

Gentile signed with Fort Lauderdale Strikers of NASL in December 2015.

On July 8, 2016 Gentile was traded by Fort Lauderdale to the Ottawa Fury in exchange for Brazilian winger Paulo Jr. In December 2016 the club announced, that Gentile wouldn't continue in the club.

Gentile joined Puerto Rico FC ahead of the 2017 season. He was released at the end of the season.

Gentile joined USL side Richmond Kickers for the 2018 season on January 23, 2018.

Gentile signed with USL Championship expansion club Hartford Athletic on January 23, 2019. Gentile returned to Switzerland in January 2020, joining FC Linth 04.

Personal life
Gentile is currently back in Switzerland playing soccer and working in finance. He is multilingual. He can speak English, German, Italian, and Spanish. His mother is Cuban-American and his father is Italian-Swiss. His mother would read books to him in English as well as make him watch movies and television in English.

References

External links
Chicago Fire bio
USSF Development Academy bio

Living people
1992 births
American soccer players
Soccer players from Miami
Association football forwards
Charlotte 49ers men's soccer players
Chicago Fire FC players
Charlotte Eagles players
Orlando City SC (2010–2014) players
San Antonio Scorpions players
FC Chiasso players
Fort Lauderdale Strikers players
Ottawa Fury FC players
Puerto Rico FC players
Richmond Kickers players
Hartford Athletic players
USL Championship players
North American Soccer League players
Swiss Challenge League players
American expatriate soccer players
Expatriate footballers in Switzerland
American expatriate sportspeople in Switzerland
Expatriate soccer players in Canada
American expatriate sportspeople in Canada
American sportspeople of Cuban descent
American people of Italian descent
American people of Swiss descent
People from Graubünden